Telford United may refer to one of two an English association football club based in Telford, Shropshire:

 Telford United F.C. –  existed under various names for a total of 132 years from its formation in 1872 until 2004
 AFC Telford United – replaced the former club in 2004